KNWS-FM, also known as Life 101.9, is a radio station in Waterloo, Iowa, United States, owned and operated by Northwestern Media, a ministry of the University of Northwestern - St Paul in Roseville, Minnesota, and supported by donations from the local community.

Life 101.9 broadcasts Contemporary Christian music. Its signal covers Waterloo, Cedar Rapids, Iowa City and surrounding areas in eastern Iowa. A live stream is available on the Life 101.9 website, mobile app and on Amazon smart speakers. The station also broadcasts its programming on translator stations K245AZ, serving Dubuque at 96.9FM; and, K242BX, serving Marshalltown at 96.3 FM.

Adam Hannan and April Wilson host the Morning Show from 6-10am weekdays. Other station personalities include Jenn Pooler, David A. Dein, Rick Hall and Lyle Krueger.

The radio station broadcasts commercial-free contemporary Christian music 24 hours a day.

Life 101.9 is active in the community and encourages listeners to help other non-profit organizations in Eastern Iowa on a regular basis.

Life 101.9's sister station, Faith Radio, broadcasts a Christian talk and teaching format.

Translators

External links
 www.life1019.com

Waterloo, Iowa
Northwestern Media
NWS-FM